Gerald "Jerry" Zandstra, is an ordained minister in the Christian Reformed Church, and currently serves in Wayland CRC  and is the co-founder of The Inno-Versity Group.

Christian Reformed Minister 
Zandstra was ordained as an ordained minister of the Word in the Christian Reformed Church on October 6, 1991 at Midland Park, NJ. He served the following CR churches: Midland Park, NJ, 1991–93; Seymour, Grand Rapids, MI, 1993–2000; Hillside, Cutlerville, MI, 2001-06 (Leave, 2005–06); Interim, Wayland, MI, 2006–13;  Wayland, MI, 2013

Education Interest

Zandstra holds a Bachelor's degree from Calvin College, two Master's degrees from Calvin Theological Seminary, a Doctor of Divinity from Trinity Evangelical Divinity School, and  a second doctorate from the Western Michigan University School of Public Affairs.

He has taught in the MBA program at Cornerstone University.  Zandstra was also an advisor to the Kenyan Constitutional Committee.

Zandstra has been involved with forming Charter Schools and has been part of the creating of charter schools in Michigan.

Acting 
Zandstra played the character Reverend Jerry Wells in The Genesis Code, produced by American Epic Entertainment, of which, he has been the president.

Business 
Zandstra co-founded Inno-Versity, a "world-class learning agency that uses exceptional creativity, the best of learning science, and innovative technology. Their team of instructional designers and creative specialists work with top global brands specializing in gamification, blended learning, eLearning, scenario-based learning, mobile learning, Instructor-Led Training, learning application development, animations, and AR/VR.".

Personal life 
Zandstra grew up in Highland, Indiana and is also married and has three sons

References

External links

The Inno-Versity Group
The Genesis Code Movie

Western Michigan University alumni
Living people
Michigan Republicans
American people of Dutch descent
Year of birth missing (living people)
Calvin University alumni
Trinity Evangelical Divinity School alumni
Cornerstone University faculty